The 1937 National Football League Draft was the second draft held by the National Football League (NFL). The draft took place December 12, 1936, at the Hotel Lincoln in New York City. The draft consisted of 10 rounds, with 100 player selections, two of which would later become members of the Professional Football Hall of Fame. Notable for this draft were the league's draft selections for a planned expansion team, the Cleveland Rams, who were admitted into the league prior to the 1937 season. The Philadelphia Eagles used the first overall pick to select back Sam Francis, but ended up trading him to Chicago Bears two months later.

Player selections

Round one

Round two

Round three

Round four

Round five

Round six

Round seven

Round eight

Round nine

Round ten

Hall of Famers
 Sammy Baugh, quarterback from Texas Christian University taken 1st Round 6th Overall by the Boston Redskins.
Inducted: Professional Football Hall of Fame class of 1963.

 Clarence “Ace” Parker, back from Duke University taken 2nd Round 13th Overall by the Brooklyn Dodgers.
Inducted: Professional Football Hall of Fame class of 1972.

Notable undrafted players

References

External links
 NFL Website – 1937 Draft
 databaseFootball Website – 1937 Draft
 Pro Football Hall of Fame

National Football League Draft
Draft
NFL Draft
American football in New York City
Sporting events in New York City
1930s in Manhattan
Sports in Manhattan
NFL Draft